Thomas Archer (ca. 1619 – 1685) was an English politician who sat in the House of Commons in 1659 and 1660. He fought in the Parliamentary army in the English Civil War.

Life
Archer was the eldest surviving son of Sir Simon Archer of Umberslade Hall in Tanworth in Arden, Warwickshire and his wife by Anne Ferrers, daughter of Sir John Ferrers of Tamworth Castle, Staffordshire. He was baptised on 14 January 1619.

Archer served as a Parliamentary Colonel during the English Civil War. In 1659, he was elected Member of Parliament for Warwick in the Third Protectorate Parliament. He was elected  MP for Warwickshire in April 1660 for the Convention Parliament.

Archer died at the age of about 66 and was buried at Tamworth on 25 October 1685.

Family
Archer married Anne Lye daughter of Richard Lye or Leigh, merchant of London by 1650, They had three sons and two daughters. His eldest son and heir was Andrew Archer and his second son was Thomas Archer, the architect and courtier. Of his other children, Leigh died unmarried, Elizabeth married Sir Herbert Croft, 1st Baronet, and Frances married Sir Francis Rouse, 3rd Baronet.

References

Richard Cust, ‘Archer, Sir Simon (1581–1662)’, Oxford Dictionary of National Biography, (Oxford University Press, 2004) , accessed 8 Nov 2008.
Andor Gomme, ‘Archer, Thomas (1668/9–1743)’, Oxford Dictionary of National Biography, (Oxford University Press, September 2004; online edn, January 2008) , accessed 8 November 2008.

|-

1619 births
1685 deaths
People from Tanworth-in-Arden
Roundheads
English MPs 1659
English MPs 1660